GAEC may refer to:

 Gafat Armament Engineering Complex, a military production facility of the Ethiopian Defense Industry
 Ghana Atomic Energy Commission
 Greek Atomic Energy Commission